Brignac is a commune in the Morbihan department of Brittany in northwestern France.

Population
Inhabitants of Brignac are called Brignacois in French.

See also
Communes of the Morbihan department

References
 Mayors of Morbihan Association

External links
 

Communes of Morbihan